Brad Jones Racing is an Australian motor racing team owned by Brad Jones based in Albury. The team competes in the Supercars Championship and the Super2 Series. Recently they have also returned to Australian Formula Ford where Brad and Kim began their careers. The team is the only rurally based Supercars team. The team's current drivers are Andre Heimgartner, Macauley Jones, Bryce Fullwood, and Jack Smith.

History
Brad Jones Racing began as a Formula Ford team in which both Brad and Kim Jones raced. Kim stopped racing relatively early, partially in recognition of Brad's ability as a driver with Kim becoming team manager. The team's peak in open-wheel racing came when, running an Elwyn chassis, Brad finished sixth in the 1981 TAA Formula Ford Driver to Europe Series. The pair faded as the 1980s developed, though Brad Jones would continue driving Bryan Thompson's twin-turbo Mercedes-Benz 450 SLC - Chevrolet in Sports Sedan and GT racing.

When Thompson came out of driving retirement in 1983, Brad Jones moved into driving a Mitsubishi Starion in Group E Series Production Touring Cars. Jones and the turbocharged Starion came to almost dominate Group E racing  in Australia during 1983 and 1984 which led to the Jones brothers becoming involved in Kevin Bartlett's Mitsubishi touring car team, known occasionally as Mitsubishi Ralliart. Racing with Mitsubishi gave Brad several opportunities to race overseas, racing the Starion turbos in Australia, Japan and across Asia. During this time, Brad Jones again linked with Bryan Thompson to drive both the Mercedes Chev and a Chevrolet Monza to 2nd place (behind Thompson who also drove both cars) in the 1985 Australian GT Championship. Jones also drove the Monza in selected races throughout 1986, mostly at their "local" track, the Winton Motor Raceway.

By the end of 1986, the Starion, despite its straight-line speed, had faded as a truly competitive touring car and Brad Jones become a hired gun driver for other touring car teams. The Ralliart Australia team was revived in 1987, though Brad Jones was surprisingly overlooked for a seat at the 1987 James Hardie 1000. He was back with the team for the 1988 Tooheys 1000 which saw his best result to date in the Bathurst 1000 when he and former Nissan driver Terry Shiel drove the aging Starion to 10th place. He was then hired to race the full 1989 Australian Touring Car season in a turbocharged Ford Sierra RS500 for Peter Brock's Mobil 1 Racing. During the 1990s, Brad Jones was hired to drive in the late season endurance races at Sandown and Bathurst for the Holden Racing Team, Wayne Gardner Racing and Larkham Motor Sport.

Australian Stock Car Auto Racing
A way forward emerged with the creation of AUSCAR racing in Australia with the newly redeveloped Brad Jones Racing one of the first teams involved in the fledgling stock car series running Holden Commodores. BJR got their first start in AUSCAR in the 3rd annual Goodyear AUSCAR 200 at the Calder Park Thunderdome in 1988 in a Holden VL Commodore dubbed the "Green Meanie". Brad Jones qualified 5th and a strong run inside the top 10 saw him established as one of the front-runners.

Initially BJR raced only in AUSCAR, the second-tier series behind  NASCAR where they quickly grew to become the dominant team in the series, winning five consecutive titles from 1990 to 1994. Occasional forays into Australia's NASCAR series blossomed into a full NASCAR campaign in the 1994/95 season and the team were rewarded with a sixth consecutive title with Jones this time driving a Chevrolet Lumina.

Super Touring
After running a Super Production Car Lotus Esprit to another title victory in 1994, BJR moved away from the fading Superspeedway scene into circuit racing and in 1995 entered the Australian Super Touring series as the official Audi team in the series, fielding a pair of Audi A4 Quattros for himself and Greg Murphy. The team then spent the next five years swapping titles with Paul Morris Motorsport, the official BMW team, with Jones winning the championship in 1996 and 1998. Murphy and later Cameron McConville (who replaced Murphy in 1997) won many races during the six-year period when Super Touring was at its peak.

During this time Brad Jones Racing twice finished on the podium in the two Bathurst 1000 races held for Super Touring cars. Jones himself finished second in 1997 with Frank Biela, and third in 1998 with McConville.

In 2000 while still heading Audi's Super Touring team in Australia, Jones was drafted into the Audi Sport North America sports car team for the Race of a Thousand Years, an American Le Mans Series race held on 31 December 2000 at the Adelaide Street Circuit. Jones was brought in as a third driver in the Allan McNish / Rinaldo Capello driven Audi R8 after Scotsman McNish had hurt his back 2 days before the race while stepping out of his Kilt after some publicity photos. Jones qualified the car (Capello won the pole), but McNish recovered to race and Jones remained a spectator for the 225 lap event which was won by McNish and Capello.

Supercars Championship

Debut in Supercars

The team entered the V8 series in 2000 after purchasing a Ford AU Falcon and Racing Entitlement Contract from Longhurst Racing. Running as a one car team in 2000 and 2001, the team achieved modest results, highlighted by second place at the 2001 Bathurst 1000 where Jones partnered John Cleland.

In 2002 BJR expanded to two cars, with former ATCC champion John Bowe joining the team. Performance at Bathurst continued to be strong, Bowe qualifying 2nd in 2002 and 2003, and the Bowe-Jones combination finishing 3rd in 2004.

In 2005, BJR won their first race at the Australian Grand Prix (Non-Championship) courtesy of Bowe in race 2, but success in the following championship rounds eluded them. A low for the year came at the Bathurst 1000 when Jones was caught up in a lap 1 accident with Garth Tander and Greg Ritter.

In 2006 used Stone Brothers Racing engines. The season was marred with bad luck, with the new spec SBR engines power not suiting the BJR engineered chassis and one of the co-drivers for the Sandown 500 and Bathurst 1000, Mark Porter, died while racing in the development series.

In 2007, Brad's nephew and Kim's son Andrew Jones replaced John Bowe. Once again, the team struggled on in the early stage of this season and Brad Jones announced his retirement mid-season. Team BOC drafted 2001 Development Series champion Simon Wills to drive the now vacated No. 14 BF Falcon at round 4 at Winton. The season had another bad season, with less than pleasing results and at the biggest race of the year, Bathurst, both cars failed to finish with car No. 14 crashing heavily in qualifying and car No. 12 having an engine fire.

Move To Holden 
In 2008 Brad Jones Racing decided it was time for a change after finishing the 2007 teams championship in last position, behind numerous single car operations. They made the decision to change their manufacturer from their long standing association Ford to the rival Holden. They bought two Holden VE Commodores previously campaigned by the Holden Racing Team.

Cameron McConville returned to the team in 2008. In 2009 Jason Richards joined the team replacing Andrew Jones.

In 2010, Jason Bright replaced the retiring McConville. Bright brought his Britek Motorsport REC which was used to enter a third car for Karl Reindler. The team's endurance drivers were Andrew Jones in No. 8, Matt Halliday in No. 14 and David Wall in No. 21. For the Phillip Island round, Bright debuted a brand new Chassis, also constructed by the BJR team. Fabrizio Giovanardi and Alain Menu were the international enduro drivers for October's Gold Coast 600, with Giovandari with Reindler in No. 21 and Menu with Bright in No. 14. After the Symmons Plains event in Tasmania, Jason Richards was diagnosed with stomach cancer and couldn't compete in the final two events of 2010. Enduro driver Andrew Jones replaced him for final two events of 2010.

For the 2011 season, Jason Bargwanna joined the team. Jason Bright won the team's first V8 Supercar race, winning Race 8 in Perth, this was then backed up by another win at Winton. The Endurance drivers were Andrew Jones in No. 8, Shane Price in No. 14, and David Wall in No. 21. Fabrizio Giovanardi, Allan Simonsen and Stéphane Sarrazin were the international enduro drivers for October's Gold Coast 600, with Giovandari with Reindler in No. 21 and Simonsen with Bargwanna in No. 14 and Sarrazin with Bright in No. 8. The 2011 season ended on a sad note, with Jason Richards losing his battle with cancer.

For 2012, Fabian Coulthard replaced Bargwanna in the No.14 Entry with David Wall joining the team to drive the No.21 Car, Replacing Karl Reindler.

All three drivers remained with the team for 2013. Dale Wood joined the team in 2014 replacing David Wall.

For 2016, Fabian Coulthard left the team. He was replaced by Tim Slade in the team No. 14 Freightliner Entry. Tim Blanchard also replaced Dale Wood in the No. 21 Customer Britek Motorsport entry for 2016.

For the 2017 Season, Jason Bright will leave the team after 7 Years. He will be replaced by Nick Percat in the Teams No. 8 Entry. BOC will also step down as naming rights sponsor of the No. 8 Entry after 12 Years with the team.

Results

Bathurst 1000 results

 — Mark Porter practiced in the #12 Falcon but was badly injured after a serious crash in a Fujitsu V8 Supercar Series race on the Friday before the race. Michael Caruso was drafted into the team to replace him. Porter would die on the Sunday afternoon from the injuries in the crash.
 — Ashley Walsh practiced in the #14 Commodore but was replaced by Andre Heimgartner due to his injuries.

Supercars results

Car No. 4 results

Car No. 8 results

Car No. 14 results

Car No. 96 results

Supercars Championship drivers
The following is a list of drivers who have driven for the team in the Supercars Championship, in order of their first appearance. Drivers who only drove for the team on a part-time basis are listed in italics.

 Brad Jones (2000–09)
 Tomas Mezera (2000)
 John Cleland (2001–05)
 John Bowe (2002–06)
 Tim Leahey (2002)
 Andrew Jones (2003–04, 2007–16)
 Dale Brede (2005–06)
 Mark Porter (2006)
 Michael Caruso (2006)
 Simon Wills (2007)
 Damien White (2007)
 Christian Murchison (2007)
 Cameron McConville (2008–09, 2011)
 Max Wilson (2008)
 Jason Richards (2009–10)
 Jason Bright (2010–16)
 Matt Halliday (2010)
 Alain Menu (2010)
 Jason Bargwanna (2011)
 Shane Price (2011)
 Stéphane Sarrazin (2011–12)
 Allan Simonsen (2011)
 Fabian Coulthard (2012–15)
 David Besnard (2012)
 Nicolas Minassian (2012)
 Luke Youlden (2013–15)
 Tim Slade (2016–19)
 Ashley Walsh (2016–19)
 Andre Heimgartner (2017, 2022–present)
 Nick Percat (2017–21)
 Macauley Jones (2017–18, 2021–present)
 Jack Smith (2019–present)
 Tim Blanchard (2019)
 Todd Hazelwood (2020–21)
 Thomas Randle (2020)
 Jack Perkins (2020)
 Jordan Boys (2020, 2022)
 Chris Pither (2021)
 Dale Wood (2021–present)
 Dean Fiore (2021–present)
 David Wall (2021)
 Bryce Fullwood (2022–present)

Super2 drivers 

The following list of drivers have driven for the team in the Super2 Series. The drivers who drove for the team on a part-time basis are listed in italics

 Andrew Jones (2002-2004, 2011-2017)
 Dale Brede (2005)
 Luke Youlden (2013)
 Chris Pither (2013-2014)
 Macauley Jones (2014-2018)
 Josh Kean (2015-2016)
 Jack Smith (2017-2019)
 Zane Goddard (2018)
 Tim Blanchard (2019)
 Josh Fife (2020)
 Elly Morrow (2022)
 Lachie Dalton (2022 - Present)

Super3 Drivers

 Josh Smith (2016)
 Jack Smith (2017–2018)
 Harry Hayek (2018)
 Madeline Stewart (2019)
 Josh Fife (2019)
 Elly Morrow (2021)

References

External links
Team BOC website
Freightliner Racing website

Albury, New South Wales
Australian auto racing teams
Sports teams in New South Wales
Supercars Championship teams